Geoffrey Christopher Ward, FRSA (born 1954) is a British academic specialising in American literature. He has been Principal of Homerton College, University of Cambridge since 2013. In 2020, the College announced that Ward would retire in September 2021 after eight years as Principal.

Early life and education
Ward was educated at Manchester Grammar School, and Clare College, Cambridge, where he read English Literature and graduated with a first-class degree in 1975. Later, in 2006, he graduated with a Doctor of Philosophy (PhD), also from the University of Cambridge.

Academic career
He formerly worked as lecturer then senior lecturer in English at the University of Liverpool. Following a year spent lecturing in Japan, he took up a Chair and the Headship of Department at the University of Dundee in 1995. His first book Statutes of Liberty: The New York School of Poets (1993: new edition, 2001) was succeeded by other books and articles including The Writing of America: Literature and Cultural Identity from the Puritans to the Present (Polity, 2002), which he researched during a year spent in the USA as a Fellow of the Leverhulme Foundation. In 2002, he was made a Deputy Principal at Dundee. He left four years later to serve as Dean of the Faculty of Arts and then Vice Principal at Royal Holloway, University of London. He joined Homerton College, Cambridge as Principal in 2013.

In addition to his scholarly work, he has written and presented occasional broadcasts for BBC Radio 3, including on David Foster Wallace. A Life Fellow of the Royal Society of Arts, he has also been elected to an Honorary Fellowship at Harris Manchester College, Oxford.

Personal life
In 1992, Ward married Marion Wynne-Davies. Wynne-Davies is also a scholar of literature, and specialises in Renaissance literature. Together, they have two sons.

References

 

 
 
 

1954 births
Living people
People educated at Manchester Grammar School
Academics of Royal Holloway, University of London
Alumni of Clare College, Cambridge
Fellows of Homerton College, Cambridge